Ciolanu Monastery is a monastery of Eastern Orthodox monks, located in Tisău commune, Buzău County, Romania. It was erected around 1570 by Dumitru Ciolanu, a boyar from Buzău, whose name it bears, together with the Sorescu boyar family from the nearby Vernești commune.

The compound contains a museum with icons painted by Gheorghe Tattarescu, as well as religious artifacts.

Historic monuments in Buzău County
Romanian Orthodox monasteries of Wallachia
Christian monasteries established in the 16th century
Museums in Buzău County
Religious museums in Romania